Overhills is an unincorporated community located in the Johnsonville Township of Harnett County,  North Carolina, United States, near the Cumberland County town of Spring Lake. It is a part of the Dunn Micropolitan Area, which is also a part of the greater Raleigh–Durham–Cary Combined Statistical Area (CSA) as defined by the United States Census Bureau.

The community was originally a  estate owned by the Percy Rockefeller family but later acquired by the federal government and is now mostly located inside nearby Fort Bragg . A Donald Ross-designed golf course was added to the estate in two separate projects  and is also now located inside Fort Bragg.

References

External links
Fort Bragg's Overhills website
, along with photos and measured drawings of about 45 individual structures
Historic American Engineering Record documentation:

Historic American Buildings Survey in North Carolina
Historic American Engineering Record in North Carolina
Historic American Landscapes Survey in North Carolina
Unincorporated communities in Harnett County, North Carolina
Unincorporated communities in North Carolina